The UK Albums Chart is a music chart compiled by the Official Charts Company (OCC) that calculates the best-selling artist albums of the week in the United Kingdom. Since 2005, the chart has been based on the sales of both physical and digital albums, on the condition that the album was available in both formats. In January 2007, the rules were changed so that legal downloads of all albums, irrespective of whether a physical copy was available, were eligible to chart. Further changes occurred in February 2015 when audio streaming was included for the first time.

On 11 December 2019, the OCC announced their list of the top 100 best-selling albums between January 2010 and December 2019. The best-selling album of the decade is Adele's 21, which sold 6 million following its release in January 2011. Adele is also one of two artists to achieve three million-selling albums since 2010 with 19 (released in 2008 but sold over a million copies since 2010), 21 and 25. The other is Ed Sheeran with +, x and ÷. Sheeran is also the only artist to feature in the top 10 three times.

Best-selling albums since 2010

 Released before 2010; only sales from 2010 onwards included

Best-selling debut albums

See also
 List of best-selling albums of the 21st century in the United Kingdom
 List of best-selling singles of the 2010s in the United Kingdom

Notes

References

2000s
United Kingdom
2000s (UK)
British record charts